Amish Sidhu (born 15 October 1996) is an Indian cricketer who plays domestic cricket in Ireland for Phoenix. He made his List A debut on 6 May 2021, for Munster Reds in the 2021 Inter-Provincial Cup.

References

External links
 

1996 births
Living people
Indian cricketers
Irish cricketers
Munster Reds cricketers
People from Faridkot district
Indian emigrants to Ireland
Irish people of Indian descent
Irish people of Punjabi descent